Bishop Francisco Jesús Orozco Mengibar is the current bishop of the Roman Catholic Diocese of Guadix, Spain.

Early life and education 
Francisco was born on 23 April 1970 in Villafranca de Córdoba, Spain. He has acquired bachelor's degree in theology from Comillas Pontifical University, Madrid and a licentiate and a doctorate in fundamental theology from Pontifical Lateran University.

Priesthood 
Francisco received his priestly ordination from Bishop José Antonio Infantes Florido on 9 July 1995.

Episcopate 
On 30 October 2018, Pope Francis appointed Francisco bishop of the Roman Catholic Diocese of Guadix. His episcopal ordination took place on 22 December 2018 at Guadix Cathedral.

References 

Living people
21st-century Roman Catholic bishops in Spain
1970 births
Comillas Pontifical University alumni
Pontifical Lateran University alumni